Mainland (known in French as La Grand'Terre) is a local service district and designated place in the Canadian province of Newfoundland and Labrador.
Mainland is a coastal community, bordered by both the ocean and forest. The main industry in the community has traditionally been fishing, but currently (2016) a large portion of the inhabitants leave the community seasonally to earn income.

The  community is home to one of six Francophone schools in the province, Centre Scolaire et Communautaire Ste-Anne (École Sainte-Anne), which serves students from kindergarten to grade 12. The school is adjoined by L'Association Régionale de la Côte Ouest (ARCO) and L'Héritage de l'Île Rouge.

The community boasts a robust French heritage, and a large percentile of the community is French speaking.

The predominant religion practiced is Roman Catholic. The chapel (St. Ann's Chapel) is part of the Roman Catholic Diocese of Corner Brook and Labrador.

There is a small island clearly visible from the town, named L'Île Rouge (Red Island). Local folklore is that it was given the name, as it appears to glow red during sunset at a certain point in the year. The island is uninhabited and with the exception of birds, holds no wildlife.

The nearest towns are Three Rock Cove and Cape St. George. The nearest large shopping center is Stephenville. The nearest hospital is also located in Stephenville.

Mainland has the status of designated place in Canadian census data. In the Canada 2006 Census, the community had a population of 311.

The community is historically notable as one of the island's centres of Franco-Newfoundlander settlement and culture. In 2009, CJRM-FM, a francophone community radio station from Labrador City, applied to add a rebroadcaster in the community.

After a successful community fundraising campaign, Bell Mobility agreed to install a cellphone tower to serve Mainland and nearby Three Rock Cove.

Geography 
Mainland is in Newfoundland within Subdivision E of Division No. 4.

Demographics 

Government 
Mainland is a local service district (LSD) that is governed by a committee responsible for the provision of certain services to the community. The chair of the LSD committee is Sherisse Benoit.

See also 
List of communities in Newfoundland and Labrador
List of designated places in Newfoundland and Labrador
List of local service districts in Newfoundland and Labrador

References 

Designated places in Newfoundland and Labrador
Local service districts in Newfoundland and Labrador